PGV may refer to:

  Peak Ground Velocity in seismology
 Pitt-Greenville Airport
 PhpGedView, web-based genealogy software
 Puna Geothermal Venture